

Group A
Group A tournament was played in Megève and Saint-Gervais-les-Bains, France, from 14 to 20 December 2009.

Final standings

Results
All times are local (CET – UTC+1).

Group B
Group B tournament was played in Gdańsk, Poland, from 14 to 20 December 2009.

Final standings

Results
All times are local (CET – UTC+1).

References

I
World Junior Ice Hockey Championships – Division I
International ice hockey competitions hosted by France
International ice hockey competitions hosted by Poland
World
World